Scouting in New Mexico has had a rich and colorful history, from the 1910s to the present day, serving thousands of youth in programs that suit the environment in which they live. The state is home to the Philmont Scout Ranch.

Early history (1910–1950) 

On May 11, 1941, the Boy Scouts of America honored Major Frederick Russell Burnham on his eightieth birthday, at Carlsbad Caverns, New Mexico.  Burnham had only recently returned from Cabeza Prieta National Wildlife Refuge which he had dedicated with the Boy Scouts in Arizona after a long campaign to save the Desert Bighorn Sheep.

In 1918, the Albuquerque Council (#412) was founded. It changed its name to the Bemalillo County Council (#412)  in 1926. The council changed its name again in 1927 to the Rio Grand Area Council (#412). In 1934, the Rio Grande Area Council became the Northern New Mexico Council (#412).

In 1920, the Carlsbad Council and the Roswell Council (#413) were founded. They merged in 1924 to become the Pecos Valley Council (#413). In 1925, the Pecos Valley Council became the Eastern New Mexico Council (#413).

In 1927, the Gila Grande Council (#579) was formed, merging with the El Paso Area Council (#573) in 1930.

In 1927, the Kit Carson Council (#574) was formed, merging with the Rio Grande Council (#412) in 1929.

Recent history (1950–1990)
In 1955, the Northern New Mexico Council (#412) became the Kit Carson Council (#412). The council changed its name in 1976 to the Great Southwest Area Council, and again in 1982 to the Great Southwest Council (#412).

Scouting in New Mexico today 
There are five Boy Scouts of America (BSA) local councils in New Mexico.

Conquistador Council 

Located in southeast New Mexico, the Conquistador Council office is in Roswell, New Mexico.

Organization
Chisum Trail District
El Llano Grande District
Oil Patch District
Rio Hondo District

Camps
 Camp Wehinahpay, Wehinahpay Mountain Camp
 Dowling Aquatic Base
 Camp Jim Murray

Order of the Arrow
The Kwahadi Lodge #78 of the Order of the Arrow serves local Arrowmen.

Grand Canyon Council 

Grand Canyon Council serves Scouts in Arizona and New Mexico.

Great Southwest Council 

The Great Southwest Council is headquartered in Albuquerque, New Mexico, and provides Scouting to youth in northern New Mexico, northeast Arizona, Utah south of the San Juan River, and the Durango and Mesa Verde areas of Colorado.

Organization
Rio Grande District
San Juan Mountains District 
Sangre de Cristo District 
Sandia District

Camps
The Great Southwest Council's summer camp program is based at the Gorham Scout Ranch, located near Chimayo, New Mexico northwest of Pojoaque, New Mexico.

Great Southwest Council is home to Cimarron, New Mexico's Philmont Scout Ranch, the oldest of the national high-adventure bases operated by the Boy Scouts of America.

Although the Mesa Verde District of the Great Southwest Council includes San Juan County, Colorado, the council no longer owns or operate the Cascade Scout Camp located in the San Juan National Forest, north of Durango, Colorado, and listed on the National Register of Historic Places.

South Plains Council 

South Plains Council serves Scouts in Texas and New Mexico.

Yucca Council 

Yucca Council serves Scouts in Texas and New Mexico.

Girl Scouting in New Mexico 

Three Girl Scout Councils serve New Mexico.

Girl Scouts Arizona Cactus-Pine Council 

Most of this district is in Arizona but as the Navajo Nation straddles the border the portion of it in northwestern New Mexico is also included in this district.

Girl Scouts of New Mexico Trails 

Girl Scouts of New Mexico Trails serves some 5,000 girls in 23 counties in northern and central New Mexico. It was formed in November 2007 by the merger of the two previous councils of Sangre de Cristo and Chaparral.

Camps
Camp Elliott Barker located near Angel Fire, NM
Rancho del Chaparral located in the Jemez Mountains

Girl Scouts of the Desert Southwest

Formed from the May 1, 2009 merger of Zia, Permian Basin and Rio Grande Councils. Serving Southern New Mexico & West Texas.

Organization
Service Centers in New Mexico
Deming, NM
Artesia, NM
Las Cruces, NM
Silver City, NM

Camps 
Camp Pioneer

Scouting museums in New Mexico 

The Scouting Museum of New Mexico, formerly run by Dennis Downing was located at 400 South First Street in Raton, New Mexico, is permanently closed. The museum was privately owned at a private facility, displays included Wood Badge, Philmont, Order of the Arrow, National Jamboree, international Scouting, Scout books and magazines, videos, reference library, and also rotated loaned exhibits. 

The National Scouting Museum is located at Philmont Scout Ranch, 4 miles south of Cimarron, NM on NM-21. The National Scouting Museum is also home to the Ernest Thompson Seton Memorial Library.

See also 
Theodore Roosevelt
Asociación de Scouts de México, A.C.

External links

http://www.conquistador-bsa.org
http://www.gswcbsa.org

References

Youth organizations based in New Mexico
New Mexico
Western Region (Boy Scouts of America)